The Norfolk Black, also known as the Black Spanish or Black Turkey, is a British breed of domestic turkey. It is thought to derive from birds taken to Britain from Spain, where they had arrived with Spanish explorers returning from the New World. 

It is generally considered the oldest turkey breed in the UK.

History 

Turkeys were brought to Europe by early conquistadors returning from the New World, and were introduced to Britain – probably from Spain – in the early sixteenth century. According to the Chronicle of the Kings of England of Richard Baker of 1643, this was in the fifteenth year of the reign of Henry VIII, or about 1524. William Strickland is often credited with having brought them. Black birds had occasionally been seen among New World flocks of wild birds; European breeders selectively bred for this colour. In England, turkey farming was carried on mainly in East Anglia, and particularly in Norfolk.

In the seventeenth or eighteenth century, early colonists travelling to the New World took black-coloured turkeys with them. Cross-breeding of some of these with Meleagris gallopavo silvestris, the Eastern sub-species of the wild turkey, led to the later development of the Bronze, Narragansett and Slate breeds.
 
They remained a commercially farmed variety in the U.S. until the early 20th century, but fell out of favour after the development of the Broad Breasted Bronze and Broad Breasted White. Fairly common in Europe, they are considered an endangered variety of heritage turkey today by the American Livestock Breeds Conservancy, and are also included in Slow Food USA's Ark of Taste, a catalogue of heritage foods in danger of extinction. 

A 1998 census conducted by the American Livestock Breeds Conservancy found that there were only 200 Black Spanish turkeys remaining in the United States, which were being raised by just 15 different breeders. To help with conservation efforts, the Accokeek Foundation helped reintroduce this bird to the Potomac River tidewater region by sharing breeding stock with other historical museums and local farmers. A rafter of Black Spanish turkeys is currently being preserved by the Heritage Breed Livestock Conservation Program within the National Colonial Farm at Piscataway Park to increase public awareness of this threatened breed.

Notes

References 

Turkey breeds
Conservation Priority Breeds of the Livestock Conservancy